The presidential transition of Herbert Hoover began when he won the United States 1928 United States presidential election, becoming the president-elect, and ended when Hoover was inaugurated at noon EST on March 4, 1929.

Hoover took a "goodwill trip" to Latin America during his transition, in hopes of improving relations between the United States and nations in the region.

Hoover, largely, did not begin focusing on shaping his administration until the final two weeks of his transition. At the time that Hoover's occurred, presidential transitions were much less complex than they are today. The term "presidential transition" had not even begun to be widely applied to the period between an individual's election as president of the United States and their assumption of the office.

"Friendly takeover"
The transition was an example of a "friendly takeover", in which the outgoing president and the president-elect were of the same political party (Republican). It would be the last such transition until the 1988–89 presidential transition of George H. W. Bush.

Secret Service protection
Beginning on November 7, the day after the election, the newly-minted president-elect and his family were given protection by the United States Secret Service.

Economy
While the stock market would crash months into Hoover's presidency, starting the Great Depression, the performance of the economy during his transition appeared strong. Among United States presidential transitions, the stock market performed stronger than it had during a presidential transition for decades. The growth of the Dow Jones Industrial Average had experienced during Hoover's presidential transition (21.8%) would not be exceeded by any United States presidential transition until the presidential transition of Donald Trump.

Latin American tour

He was accompanied on the trip by his wife Lou Henry Hoover. He delivered twenty-five speeches, stressing his plans to reduce American political and military interference in Latin American affairs. In sum, he pledged that the United States would act as a "good neighbor."

Hoover's work as United States secretary of commerce had led him to view Latin America as important, and believe that there was need to improve relations. Hoover began planning the trip soon after winning the election. It was the first time that a president-elect had taken such a goodwill trip abroad. Hoover also planned the trip as means of staying away from Washington, D.C., avoiding men seeking to lobby for patronage posts.

The administration of outgoing president Calvin Coolidge lent their support to Hoover's plans to take this trip. Henry P. Fletcher accompanied Hoover on the trip, serving as  official advisor to the president-elect as well as a representative of Coolidge and the Department of State. Coolidge ordered that Hoover should be treated with presidential honors on his trip, despite Hoover having not yet entered the office.

While crossing the Andes from Chile, a plot by Argentine anarchists to bomb Hoover's train as it crossed the vast Argentinian central plain was foiled. The group of plotters were led by Severino Di Giovanni. The bomber was arrested before he could place the explosives on the rails. Hoover professed unconcern, tearing off the front page of a newspaper that revealed the plot and explaining, "It's just as well that Lou shouldn't see it," referring to his wife.

During his travels, he delivered roughly 25 speeches. Public reception in the United States of Hoover's trip was largely positive.

Vacation in Florida
After Hoover returned from his Latin American trip, he avoided the press and patronage seekers by vacationing in Florida until February 19. Hoover was in little hurry to begin preparing to take office. Presidential transitions were much less complex when Hoover took office than they have been in more recent decades.

Shaping of Hoover's administration
After his Florida vacation, Hoover began the business of shaping his administration in the final two weeks of his transition period.

Hoover retained two members of Coolidge's Cabinet. One was Secretary of the Treasury Andrew W. Mellon, whom, per the later recounting of historian David Bruner, Hoover retained in order to avoid a reaction on Wall Street, as the financial sector held Mellon in strong esteem. The other was Secretary of Labor James J. Davis, who was retained, per Bruner's accounting, in order for Hoover to avoid  the pressure to appoint John L. Lewis to the position.

References

November 1928 events in the United States
December 1928 events in the United States
January 1929 events in the United States
February 1929 events in the United States
March 1929 events in the United States
Presidential transition, Hoover
Hoover, Herbert
Presidency of Calvin Coolidge